Taqaddom or Taqaddum is a reformist political party in Lebanon founded under the basis of the 17 October Revolution. It currently has 2 seats in the Lebanese parliament, which is part of a 13 member reformist bloc, with the likes of Najat Aoun Saliba of the Chouf district and Marc Daou of the Aley district.

2022 Lebanese general elections 
Like many other candidates in its region, the party was known for its anti-Hezbollah sentiment. It presented 2 candidates and managed to win both seats in the Mount Lebanon IV electoral district with 20,988 votes together.

References 

Political parties in Lebanon
Political parties established in 2020
Centre-left parties
Centre-left parties in Asia
Social democratic parties
Social democratic parties in Asia
Social democratic parties in Lebanon